Tibor Kocsis is a Hungarian pop singer, who won the second series of the Hungarian X-Faktor broadcast on the RTL Klub Hungarian television station, with the final broadcast on 18 December 2011. Kocsis was in the "Over 25" category and was mentored by Miklós Malek Jr. winning over other finalist and eventual runner-up Enikő Muri.

Personal life
Kocsis came out as gay in October 2021.

See also
Hungarian pop

References

External links
Tibor Kocsis official Facebook page

21st-century Hungarian male singers
The X Factor winners
Living people
1981 births
Gay singers
Hungarian gay musicians
Hungarian LGBT singers